"You Get What You Give" is a song by American alternative rock band New Radicals. It was the first and most successful single from their only studio album, Maybe You've Been Brainwashed Too (1998). Released on November 3, 1998, it reached number 36 on the US Billboard Hot 100 and number eight on the Billboard Modern Rock Tracks chart. Outside the US, it reached number five in the United Kingdom, number four in Ireland, and number one in Canada and New Zealand.

In the liner notes to her 2004 compilation Artist's Choice, the Canadian songwriter Joni Mitchell praised "You Get What You Give" for "rising from the swamp of 'McMusic' like a flower of hope". In 2006, Ice-T was asked on Late Night with Conan O'Brien about what he has heard, besides rap music, in the last few years that really grabbed him and his only reply was "You Get What You Give". In a Time interview, U2 lead guitarist the Edge is quoted saying "You Get What You Give" is the song he is "most jealous of. I really would love to have written that."

LMC released a remix of this song sampling the original Alexander vocals as "LMC vs. New Radicals" in 2005, under the title "Don't Let Go". Another remix titled "You Get What You Give" was released in 2006, this time with a re-recorded vocal performance by Rachel McFarlane. This version charted at number 30 in the United Kingdom.

Composition
"You Get What You Give" has been described as an alternative rock, power pop, and pop rock song. It is written in the key of D major with a moderate tempo of 120 beats per minute.

Much of the media attention "You Get What You Give" received centered on the closing lyrics:

"Health insurance, rip-off lying
FDA, big bankers buying
Fake computer crashes dining
Cloning while they're multiplying
Fashion shoots with Beck and Hanson,
Courtney Love and Marilyn Manson
You're all fakes, run to your mansions
Come around, we'll kick your ass in."

According to lead singer Gregg Alexander, he had written this section for the song as a test to see whether the media would focus on the important political issues of the first few lines, or the petty celebrity-dissing. As suspected, a considerable amount of press began to appear about the name-dropping, and the other political issues were largely ignored.

Marilyn Manson commented that he was "not mad he said he'd kick my ass, I just don't want to be used in the same sentence with Courtney Love... I'll crack his [Alexander's] skull open if I see him." Beck reported that Alexander personally apologized for the line when they met each other by chance in a supermarket, claiming that it was never meant to be personal. Alexander collaborated with Hanson, whose drummer, Zac Hanson, called him "a bit of a character, but a cool guy."

Although the lines were used for the band's Top of the Pops appearance, it was truncated at "kick you".

Critical reception
Larry Flick from Billboard gave a mixed review of the song, saying that it was a "chugging, Wham!-style pop song with slightly cheesy lyrics", but that the ending lyrics were "interesting". Daily Record wrote, "This anthem sounds like The Waterboys at their best and has meaningful lyrics." They also added, "It may sound like Bruce Springsteen, but that's no bad thing. This upbeat anthem will be played in all the good bars of the land." A reviewer from The Mirror called it a "gold nugget of a single".

Music video

The accompanying music video for "You Get What You Give" was filmed in the Staten Island Mall in New York and directed by Evan Bernard. The New Radicals' frontman Gregg Alexander said he chose this setting because he sees the shopping mall as a metaphor for society—a fake, controlled environment engineered to encourage spending. The video showed a group of teenagers, led by Alexander, going through the mall wreaking havoc—tossing nets on security guards, placing businessmen in animal cages, knocking over merchandise, hijacking Lambrettas, and moshing in the food court.

Impact and legacy
In 2002, VH1 voted it as the 64th greatest one-hit wonder of all time. In 2007, the song was voted number 90 on VH1's "100 Greatest Songs of the 90s". It was listed number 440 on Blenders list of "The 500 Greatest Songs Since You Were Born". In 2010 it was number 106 on Pitchfork's "Top 200 Tracks of the 90s". In 2011, VH1 ranked it as 11th on "40 Greatest One-Hit Wonders of the 90s". Annie Zaleski for The A.V. Club wrote that the song was "surprisingly influential on popular music, just in a non-obvious, almost obscured way", and that it was "both a nostalgic artifact and a song that transcends any era". BBC Radio ranked the song at number 38 on its list of the "Most Heard Recordings in Britain of the Last 75 Years".

The song was used by American Vice President Kamala Harris's husband, Doug Emhoff, for his walk-on music as part of Joe Biden's inauguration in 2021. On January 20, 2021, New Radicals reunited for the first time in 22 years to perform the song during an inauguration performance on the day Biden was sworn in as president. The song was a favorite of Joe's son Beau Biden. Beau died in 2015; at his funeral, his sister Ashley recited the lyrics in her eulogy. The band had rejected offers to perform over the past 22 years but wanted to honor this day and honor Beau, who was a military veteran. The band's Gregg Alexander said prior to their performance, "We pledged if Joe [Biden] won, we'd get together and play our little song both in memory and in honor of our new president's patriot son Beau and also with the prayer of Joe being able to bring our country together again with compassion, honesty and justice for a change".

Accolades

Track listings

 UK CD single "You Get What You Give" – 4:42
 "To Think I Thought" – 2:46
 "Maybe You've Been Brainwashed Too" – 5:21

 UK cassette single "You Get What You Give" – 4:42
 "Maybe You've Been Brainwashed Too" – 5:21

 European CD single "You Get What You Give" – 4:42
 "To Think I Thought" – 2:46

 Australian CD single "You Get What You Give" – 4:42
 "To Think I Thought" – 2:46
 "Maybe You've Been Brainwashed Too" – 5:21
 "You Get What You Give" (album version) – 5:02

 Japanese CD single'
 "You Get What You Give" – 4:08
 "You Get What You Give" (album version) – 5:00
 "Maybe You've Been Brainwashed Too" (album version) – 5:20

Personnel
 Gregg Alexander – lead vocals, rhythm guitar
 Rusty Anderson – lead guitar
 John Pierce – bass guitar
 Rick Nowels – keyboard, backing vocals
 Gary Ferguson – drums
 Juliet Prater - percussion
 Richie Podler – additional vocal arrangement
 Michael Brauer – mixing

Charts and certifications

Weekly charts

Year-end charts

Certifications

Release history

References

1998 singles
1998 songs
1999 singles
MCA Records singles
New Radicals songs
Number-one singles in New Zealand
Protest songs
RPM Top Singles number-one singles
Song recordings produced by Gregg Alexander
Songs written by Gregg Alexander
Songs written by Rick Nowels
American power pop songs
American pop rock songs